Maurizio Sandro Sala (born 27 August 1958 in São Paulo) is a Brazilian former racing driver. He drove in multiple classes of racing in a career lasting from 1978 to 2004.

Racing record

Complete International Formula 3000 results
(key) (Races in bold indicate pole position; races in italics indicate fastest lap.)

24 Hours of Le Mans results

References

External links
Profile at Racing Reference.info
Profile at Driver database

1958 births
Living people
Brazilian racing drivers
Japanese Formula 3000 Championship drivers
International Formula 3000 drivers
24 Hours of Le Mans drivers
Stock Car Brasil drivers
World Sportscar Championship drivers
Racing drivers from São Paulo

Oreca drivers
Team LeMans drivers
Japanese Sportscar Championship drivers